Sir Archibald Hunter(1856–1936) was British Army general.

Archibald Hunter may also refer to:
 Archibald Hunter (hydrotherapist) (1813–1894), Scottish naturopath
 Archie Hunter (1859–1894), Scottish footballer